Khora Bhurt pass (el. 15,190 ft., also marked as 15,290 ft.) is a high mountain pass that connects Karambar river valley (upper Gilgit valley) in Ishkoman tehsil of Ghizer district in the Northern Areas of Pakistan with Wakhan Corridor in Afghanistan.

Khora Bhurt pass is also known as Khodarg Werth, Khora Burt Pass, Khord Bhort Pass, Kowtal-e Khvorah Bort.

References

Mountain passes of Afghanistan
Mountain passes of Gilgit-Baltistan
Afghanistan–Pakistan border
Wakhan
Landforms of Badakhshan Province
Mountain passes of the Hindu Kush